Anastazy Jakub Pankiewicz (July 9, 1882 – May 20, 1942) was a Polish Roman Catholic Franciscan friar and priest. He was arrested on October 10, 1941 and taken to the Nazi concentration camp at Dachau, where he died. He is one of the 108 Martyrs of World War II who were beatified by Pope John Paul II in 1999.

See also 
List of Nazi-German concentration camps
The Holocaust in Poland
World War II casualties of Poland

References

1882 births
1942 deaths
Founders of Catholic religious communities
Polish people who died in Dachau concentration camp
108 Blessed Polish Martyrs